Tommy Govan was a Scottish footballer who played during the 1950s and 1960s. He started his career with juvenile side Alva Albion Rangers before signing 'senior' with Dumbarton in 1957. Here he was a constant in the Dumbarton defence for over 10 years before moving on to Alloa Athletic.

References

Scottish footballers
Dumbarton F.C. players
Alloa Athletic F.C. players
Scottish Football League players
Living people
Place of birth missing (living people)
Association football fullbacks
Year of birth missing (living people)
Alva Albion Rangers F.C. players